Poland men's national volleyball team may refer to:

Poland men's national volleyball team
Poland women's national volleyball team